Gymnopilus bellulus is a species of mushroom in the family Hymenogastraceae.  It was given its current name by American mycologist Murrill in 1917. It is odorless, bitter in taste, and regarded as inedible.

Description
The gills are yellow and turn brownish with age. The stipe is red-brown.

Habitat and distribution
Gymnopilus bellulus has been found on conifer stumps and logs in the Northern United States, Tennessee, and Canada from June to January. It also occurs in Europe.

See also

List of Gymnopilus species

References

External links
Index Fungorum

bellulus
Inedible fungi
Taxa named by Charles Horton Peck